Barbara Jean Lee (née Tutt; born July 16, 1946) is an American politician and social worker who has served as a U.S. representative from California since 1998. A member of the Democratic Party, Lee represents  (numbered as the 9th district from 1998 to 2013 and as the 13th district from 2013 to 2023), which is based in Oakland and covers most of the northern part of Alameda County. According to the Cook Partisan Voting Index, it is one of the nation's most Democratic districts, with a rating of D+40.

Born and raised in Texas, Lee holds degrees from Mills College and the University of California, Berkeley. She started her career by working on the presidential campaign of Shirley Chisholm and was later involved with the Black Panther Party. After working as chief of staff for U.S. Representative Ron Dellums, Lee served in the California State Assembly from 1990 to 1996 and in the California State Senate from 1996 to 1998.

Lee was elected to the House of Representatives in a 1998 special election to succeed Dellums. A noted progressive, she chaired the Congressional Progressive Caucus from 2005 to 2009 and the Congressional Black Caucus from 2009 to 2011. In addition, she is the vice chair and a founding member of the Congressional LGBTQ+ Equality Caucus, a co-chair of the Congressional Cannabis Caucus, and a co-chair of the House Democratic Steering Committee. She has played a major role in the antiwar movement, notably in her vocal criticism of the Iraq War and for being the only member of Congress to vote against the authorization of use of force following the September 11 attacks.

Lee is a candidate for the United States Senate in the 2024 election to succeed Dianne Feinstein, who is retiring.

Early life and education
Lee was born Barbara Jean Tutt on July 16, 1946, in El Paso, Texas. She is the daughter of Mildred Adaire (née Parish) and Garvin Alexander Tutt, a lieutenant colonel in the United States Army. When she was born in a segregated hospital, her mother was left in the hallway as the hospital refused to assist her. Lee is African American; according to a DNA analysis, she descends primarily from the people of Guinea-Bissau and Sierra Leone. She was raised Catholic and attended Catholic schools, where she was taught by the Sisters of Loretto. She was the only African American Girl Scout in El Paso and recalls facing racial discrimination throughout her childhood.

Lee moved to California with her parents in 1960. She attended San Fernando High School in the Pacoima neighborhood of Los Angeles, where she worked with the NAACP to become the school's first African American cheerleader, and graduated in 1964. When she was 15, Lee had a back-alley abortion in Ciudad Juárez. She married Carl Lee, a member of the United States Air Force, and moved with him to England after high school; they had two children and divorced when Lee was 20. Lee describes the marriage as abusive and became homeless following the divorce.

She later moved to the Bay Area and attended Mills College, where she served as president of the college's Black Student Union and graduated in 1973 with a bachelor of arts in psychology. She later attended the University of California, Berkeley and graduated in 1975 with a master of social work. Throughout college, Lee was a single mother of two on public assistance and food stamps, and she often took her children to class because she was unable to afford child care.

Early political career
Lee worked for the Glendale Welfare Council and later as a statistical clerk for the California Department of Labor Statistics. As president of the Mills College Black Student Union, Lee invited Representative Shirley Chisholm to speak on campus. She was inspired to register to vote by Chisholm's visit and went on to work on Chisholm's 1972 presidential campaign, serving as one of her delegates at the 1972 Democratic National Convention. Lee later said Chisholm was a mentor who inspired her to run for office. Also while a student, Lee volunteered at the Oakland chapter of the Black Panther Party's Community Learning Center and worked on Black Panther co-founder Bobby Seale's 1973 campaign for mayor of Oakland. Lee was surveilled by the Federal Bureau of Investigation due to her involvement with the Black Panthers.

As a graduate student, Lee founded the Community Health Alliance for Neighborhood Growth and Education (CHANGE), a community-based mental health clinic. She was later offered an internship in the office of Representative Ron Dellums, who represented an Oakland-based district. Following the internship, she took a full-time job in Dellums' office and eventually became his chief of staff. Lee was one of the only African Americans and women to hold a senior staff position on Capitol Hill. After leaving Dellums' office in 1987, she returned to the Bay Area and founded a facilities management company.

California State Legislature 
Lee was elected to the California State Assembly in 1990 to succeed Elihu Harris, who retired to successfully run for mayor of Oakland. She served three terms in the Assembly and was elected to the California State Senate in 1996. She resigned her seat in the State Senate after winning a special election to the U.S. House of Representatives in 1998.

Lee was the first African American woman to represent Northern California in the California State Legislature. During her time in the Legislature, she authored 67 bills that were signed into law by then-Governor Pete Wilson, a Republican; among those bills were the California Schools Hate Crimes Prevention Act and the California Violence Against Women Act. Lee also worked to defeat California's three-strikes law and was an early champion of LGBTQ+ rights.

Lee was a member of the California Commission on the Status of Women and founded the California Commission on the Status of African American Males.

U.S. House of Representatives

Elections 

After Dellums retired from the U.S. House of Representatives in 1998, Lee successfully ran in the special election to succeed him, winning 66% of the vote. She was elected to a full term later that year, winning 83% of the vote. She has since been re-elected to the House of Representatives 12 more times.

In lieu of running for a 14th term, Lee is running to succeed Dianne Feinstein in the United States Senate in 2024.

Tenure 
Lee originally represented California's 9th congressional district, which she represented until 2013. She later represented the 13th district from 2013 to 2023 and has represented the 12th district since 2023. Her district is located in Alameda County and includes the cities of Oakland, Berkeley, Emeryville, Alameda, Albany, Piedmont, San Leandro, and most of San Lorenzo. The Cook Partisan Voting Index gives her district a rating of D+40, making it one of the most Democratic districts in the nation.

Lee's voting record as a member of Congress was ranked by the National Journal in 2007, based on roll-call votes on economic, social and foreign policy issues in 2006. Lee scored an overall 84.3%, meaning she voted with a more liberal stance than 84.3% of the House. National Journal scored Lee as voting 82% liberal on economic issues, 92% liberal on social issues, and 65% liberal on foreign policy. The 92% rating on social issues came from Lee being grouped with 35 other House legislators who all tied for the highest, most liberal ranking. Lee received a 97% progressive rating from "The Progressive Punch" and a 4% conservative rating from the American Conservative Union. In 2016, GovTrack's 2015 Report Card on members in Congress ranked Lee the 3rd most progressive member of the House.

Lee endorsed Barack Obama in the 2008 Democratic presidential primaries. In February 2019, she endorsed Kamala Harris in the 2020 Democratic presidential primaries.

As of October 2021, Lee had voted in line with President Joe Biden's stated position 100% of the time.

AUMF opposition

Lee gained national attention in 2001 as the only member of Congress to vote against the Authorization for Use of Military Force Against Terrorists (AUMF), stating that she voted no not because she opposed military action but because she believed the AUMF, as written, granted the president overly broad powers to wage war at a time when the facts regarding the situation were not yet clear. She "warned her colleagues to be 'careful not to embark on an open-ended war with neither an exit strategy nor a focused target. Lee has said:It was a blank check to the president to attack anyone involved in the September 11 events—anywhere, in any country, without regard to our nation's long-term foreign policy, economic and national security interests, and without time limit. In granting these overly broad powers, the Congress failed its responsibility to understand the dimensions of its declaration. I could not support such a grant of war-making authority to the president; I believe it would put more innocent lives at risk. The president has the constitutional authority to protect the nation from further attack, and he has mobilized the armed forces to do just that. The Congress should have waited for the facts to be presented and then acted with fuller knowledge of the consequences of our action.Her vote made national news and a large and extremely polarized response, with the volume of calls gridlocking the switchboard of her Capitol Hill office. Although it appears to have reflected the beliefs of the majority of her constituents, the majority of responses from elsewhere in the nation were angry and hostile, some calling her "communist" and a "traitor". Many of the responses included death threats against her or her family to the point that the Capitol Police provided round-the-clock plainclothes bodyguards. Lee was also criticized by politicians and in editorial pages of conservative-leaning newspapers, such as John Fund's column in The Wall Street Journal. In 2002, she received the Seán MacBride Peace Prize from the International Peace Bureau for her vote.

In her speech, she quoted Nathan D. Baxter, dean of the Washington National Cathedral: "As we act, let us not become the evil that we deplore."

On June 29, 2017, the House Appropriations Committee approved Lee's amendment to repeal the 2001 AUMF that was the foundation of the United States' post-September 11 military actions. The amendment, if passed, would have required that the AUMF be scrapped within 240 days. In June 2021, Lee sponsored a bipartisan bill in the House to repeal the AUMF, which passed 268–161. The bill was never put to a vote in the Senate.

Foreign policy
Although Lee is considered a progressive Democrat, she has occasionally split with members of her party throughout her career, especially on foreign policy. She voted to limit military operations in the Federal Republic of Yugoslavia, against authorizing air strikes, and for a Republican-backed plan to completely withdraw U.S. troops from the operation, all in 1999. Lee voted against the Iraq War Resolution in 2002. She was one of only 46 Democrats to vote for the Online Freedom of Speech Act of 2005. Lee was one of only 13 Democrats to vote against an emergency supplemental appropriations bill in 2007 which, among other things, funded the Iraq War but required withdrawal of U.S. forces to begin by October 1, but in favor of overriding President Bush's veto of the measure on May 2. In November 2009, Lee was one of 36 representatives to vote against House Resolution 867, which condemned the UN's Goldstone Report. She voted to withdraw troops from Afghanistan in 2010 and 2011. Lee also voted in favor of similar resolutions involving troop withdrawal from Pakistan and, most recently, Libya. She joined her Republican colleagues, one of 70 Democrats to do so, in voting against a resolution to authorize limited use of force in Libya. Lee was also one of only 36 Democrats to vote to limit funds appropriated for military operations in Libya.

In an August 2017 interview, Lee said of President Donald Trump's comments on North Korea, "His saber-rattling is putting the world at risk. The United States should be the grown-up in the room", and that his rhetoric reminded her of news about the Cuban Missile Crisis during her mid-teens, adding, "the words of war weren't as profound and dangerous and scary [then] as they are now."

In September 2018, Lee was one of 11 House Democrats to sign a statement announcing their intent "to introduce a new, privileged resolution in September invoking the War Powers Resolution of 1973 to withdraw U.S. Armed Forces from engaging in the Saudi-led coalition's conflict with the Houthis should additional escalations continue and progress fail to be made towards a peace agreement."

In April 2019, after the House passed the resolution withdrawing American support for the Saudi-led coalition in Yemen, Lee was one of nine lawmakers to sign a letter to Trump requesting a meeting with him and urging him to sign "Senate Joint Resolution 7, which invokes the War Powers Act of 1973 to end unauthorized US military participation in the Saudi-led coalition's armed conflict against Yemen's Houthi forces, initiated in 2015 by the Obama administration." They asserted the "Saudi-led coalition's imposition of an air-land-and-sea blockade as part of its war against Yemen's Houthis has continued to prevent the unimpeded distribution of these vital commodities, contributing to the suffering and death of vast numbers of civilians throughout the country" and that Trump's approval of the resolution would send a "powerful signal to the Saudi-led coalition to bring the four-year-old war to a close".

In July 2019, Lee voted against a House resolution condemning the Global Boycott, Divestment, and Sanctions Movement targeting Israel. The resolution passed 398–17.

In October 2020, Lee co-signed a letter to Secretary of State Mike Pompeo condemning Azerbaijan's offensive operations against the Armenian-populated enclave of Nagorno-Karabakh.

In April 2021, Lee supported President Joe Biden's plan to withdraw all U.S. troops from Afghanistan.

In 2023, Lee was among 56 Democrats to vote in favor of H.Con.Res. 21 which directed President Joe Biden to remove U.S. troops from Syria within 180 days.

Gun control
Lee is a strong advocate for legislation restricting the availability of guns. She participated in the 2016 sit-in against gun violence in the House of Representatives. Democratic members of Congress adopted the slogan "No Bill, No Break" in an attempt to push the introduction of legislation increasing restrictions on guns. In a statement on the sit-in, Lee said:

Environment 
Lee introduced the Women and Climate Change Act in February 2018. The bill aims to create a Federal Interagency Working Group on Women and Climate Change. Lee said of the bill, "Climate change is already impacting communities around the world with a disproportionate effect on the world's poorest residents. Women make up the majority of the world's poor and are especially vulnerable to abrupt changes in the environment. As leaders in their families, women are called upon to find food and clean water, secure safe housing, and care for loved ones. As climate change worsens, provoking historic droughts, rising sea levels and violent storms, women and girls will bear the brunt of this global crisis".

Education
Lee is the author of the Shirley A. Chisholm United States-Caribbean Educational Exchange Act, which would enhance U.S. foreign relations with CARICOM nations. This act directs the United States Agency for International Development (USAID) to develop a comprehensive program that extends and expands existing primary and secondary school initiatives in the Caribbean to provide teacher training methods and increased community involvement in school activities. The bill is named for Shirley Chisholm, who helped inspire Lee to become involved in politics when Chisholm ran for the Democratic nomination for president; Lee was the Chisholm campaign's Northern California chair.

Black Panthers 
In 1968, Lee began volunteering at the Black Panther Party's Community Learning Center in Oakland. She also worked on Bobby Seale's 1973 campaign for mayor of Oakland.

Lee disagreed with the National Park Service removing funding for a Black Panther Legacy Project in 2017. She released a statement saying, "It is outrageous that the National Park Service has stripped resources from the Black Panther Party Research, Interpretation & Memory Project. The Black Panther Party was an integral part of the civil rights movement and the public has a right to know their history. I call upon the National Park Service and the Department of [the] Interior to provide a full explanation as to why these critical federal resources have been taken away".

Cannabis 
Lee has supported a number of efforts to reform cannabis laws in Congress. In 2018, she introduced the Marijuana Justice Act to remove cannabis from the Controlled Substances Act, penalize states that enforce cannabis laws disproportionately (regarding race or income status), and enact other social justice-related reforms. Additional legislation Lee has introduced includes the States' Medical Marijuana Property Rights Protection Act, the Veterans Medical Marijuana Safe Harbor Act, the Restraining Excessive Federal Enforcement & Regulations of Cannabis (REFER) Act, and the Realizing Equitable & Sustainable Participation in Emerging Cannabis Trades (RESPECT) Resolution. Lee was an original cosponsor of the Ending Federal Marijuana Prohibition Act when it was first introduced in 2011. In January 2019, she was named a co-chair of the Congressional Cannabis Caucus.

Presidential election objections

In 2001, Lee and other House members objected to counting Florida's electoral votes in the 2000 presidential election after a contentious recount. Because no senator joined their objection, it was dismissed by Vice President Al Gore, who lost the election to George W. Bush.

In 2005, Lee was one of 31 House Democrats who voted not to accept Ohio's electoral votes in the 2004 presidential election. Bush won Ohio by 118,457 votes.

After the 2016 presidential election, Lee objected to Michigan's and West Virginia's electoral votes. Because no senator joined her objections, they were dismissed. Donald Trump won Michigan by slightly over 10,000 votes and West Virginia by over 300,000 votes.

Defense budget
Lee called for a 10% cut to the military budget of the United States. She backed an amendment to reduce the size of the $740 billion National Defense Authorization Act for Fiscal Year 2021, but a majority of Democrats and Republicans rejected it.

Housing
Lee has made affordable housing a top priority, particularly in the East Bay. She has supported and backed legislation meant to expand home ownership opportunities, improve public housing quality, and assist the homeless.

Health care
Lee was strongly critical of the Stupak–Pitts Amendment, which places restrictions on health insurance plans providing coverage for abortions in the context of the Affordable Health Care for America Act. She supports Medicare for All.

Abortion
Lee is pro-choice. During a September 30, 2021, hearing of the House Oversight Committee, she recounted having to travel to Mexico for a back-alley abortion in the 1960s: "I'm sharing my story even though I truly believe it is personal and really nobody's business—and certainly not the business of politicians. But I'm compelled to speak out because of the real risks of the clock being turned back to those days before Roe v. Wade." Lee opposed the 2022 overturning of Roe v. Wade, which she called an "attack on reproductive freedom" and blamed on a "decades-long coordinated strategic assault on women's rights by right-wing extremists".

Economy
On September 29, 2008, Lee was one of 95 Democrats to vote against the defeated Emergency Economic Stabilization Act. She voted for a modified version on October 3.

Death penalty
In 2002, Lee's opposition to the death penalty was recognized by Death Penalty Focus, which gave her the Mario Cuomo Act of Courage Award.

Louis Farrakhan 
In March 2018, Lee said, "I unequivocally condemn Minister Farrakhan's anti-Semitic and hateful comments."

Committee assignments

 Committee on Appropriations
 Subcommittee on State, Foreign Operations, and Related Programs
 Subcommittee on Labor, Health and Human Services, and Related Programs
 Subcommittee on Agriculture, Rural Development, Food and Drug Administration, and Related Agencies.   
 Committee on the Budget

Caucus memberships and leadership
House Democratic Steering Committee (co-chair)
Medicare for All Caucus
 Task Force on Poverty and Opportunity (chair)
 Congressional Caucus on HIV/AIDS (co-chair)
 Congressional Out of Poverty Caucus (co-chair)
 Congressional Progressive Caucus (former co-chair and former whip)
 Congressional Black Caucus (former chair, 2008–2010)
 Congressional Asian Pacific American Caucus
 Health Care Task Force
 Congressional Caucus on Global Road Safety
 United States Congressional International Conservation Caucus
 Congressional LGBTQ+ Equality Caucus (vice chair and founding member)
 Congressional Social Work Caucus (chair)
 Congressional Arts Caucus
 Congressional HIV/AIDS Caucus (co-founder and co-chair)
 Congressional Pro-Choice Caucus (co-chair)
 Afterschool Caucuses
 Congressional Cannabis Caucus (co-chair)

On March 15, 2013, Lee announced the official relaunch of the Congressional Social Work Caucus to the 113th Congress as its new chair.

Lee co-chaired the Congressional Progressive Caucus with Lynn Woolsey from 2005 to 2009. She also chaired the Congressional Black Caucus from 2009 to 2011.

On November 28, 2018, Lee lost an attempt to become chair of the House Democratic Caucus to Hakeem Jeffries.

On November 30, 2018, House Democratic leader Nancy Pelosi announced that she had recommended Lee to become one of three co-chairs of the House Democratic Steering and Policy Committee alongside Rosa DeLauro and Eric Swalwell. The change was approved on December 11, 2018.

United Nations assignments
Lee was the United States representative to the 68th, 70th, and 72nd sessions of the United Nations General Assembly.

2024 U.S. Senate campaign

In January 2023, it was reported that Lee planned to run for the United States Senate seat currently held by Dianne Feinstein in 2024 after she revealed her intentions to members of the Congressional Black Caucus. The report came a day after Representative Katie Porter announced her own candidacy. A third Democrat, Adam Schiff, had also announced his candidacy, and Ro Khanna had also expressed interest in running. Lee formally launched her Senate campaign in Oakland on February 21, 2023.

Personal life

Lee married Carl Lee after graduating high school in 1964. She described the marriage as abusive and divorced her husband when she was 20. The marriage produced two children, Tony and Craig, whom she raised as a single mother. Both of Lee's sons now work in the insurance industry: Tony Lee is the CEO of Dickerson Employee Benefits, an African-American owned insurance brokerage and consulting firm; and Craig Lee is a senior executive at State Farm. 

Lee married Rev. Dr. Clyde Oden Jr., a retired pastor from Oxnard, on New Year's Eve in 2019. They live together in Oakland. 

In 2002, the Peace Abbey in Boston gave Lee the Courage of Conscience Award for her vote against the call to war after the September 11 attacks. In her speech, she said, "let us not become the evil that we deplore."

In 2003, Lee was recognized as a Woman of Peace at the Global Exchange Human Rights Awards in San Francisco with Bianca Jagger, Arundhati Roy and Kathy Kelly. In 2010, Lee took the food stamp challenge and also appeared in the documentary film Food Stamped.

In 2014, Lee, Hill Harper, and Meagan Good contributed to Enitan Bereola II's bestselling book Gentlewoman: Etiquette for a Lady, from a Gentleman.

In 2015, Lee won the 43rd Thomas Merton Award.

Electoral history

California State Assembly

California State Senate

U.S. House of Representatives

California's 9th congressional district

California's 13th congressional district 

|- class="vcard"
| style="background-color: #3333FF; width: 2px;" |
| class="org" style="width: 130px" | Democratic
| class="fn"    | Barbara Lee (incumbent)
| style="text-align:right;" | 159,751
| style="text-align:right;" | 99.3
|-
|- class="vcard"
| style="background-color: #17aa5c; width: 2px;" |
| class="org" style="width: 130px" | Green
| class="fn"    | Laura Wells (write-in)
| style="text-align:right;" | 832
| style="text-align:right;" | 0.5
|-
|- class="vcard"
| style="background-color: #E81B23; width: 2px;" |
| class="org" style="width: 130px" | Republican
| class="fn"    | Jeanne Marie Solnordal (write-in)
| style="text-align:right;" | 178
| style="text-align:right;" | 0.1
|-
|- class="vcard"
| style="background-color: #FED105; width: 2px;" |
| class="org" style="width: 130px" | Libertarian
| class="fn"    | James M. Eyer (write-in)
| style="text-align:right;" | 39
| style="text-align:right;" | 0.0
|-
|- class="vcard"
| style="background-color: #DDDDDD; width: 2px;" |
| class="org" style="width: 130px" | No party preference
| class="fn"    | Lanenna Joiner (write-in)
| style="text-align:right;" | 26
| style="text-align:right;" | 0.0
|-
|- class="vcard"
| style="background-color: ; width: 2px;" |
| class="org" style="width: 130px" | American Independent
| class="fn"    | Vincent May (write-in)
| style="text-align:right;" | 3
| style="text-align:right;" | 0.0
|-

|- class="vcard"
| style="background-color: #3333FF; width: 5px;" |
| class="org" style="width: 130px" | Democratic 
| class="fn" | Barbara Lee (incumbent) 
| style="text-align: right; margin-right: 0.5em" |  
| style="text-align: right; margin-right: 0.5em" | 88.4 
|-

California's 12th congressional district

See also
 Abby Ginzberg, director and producer of the documentary Truth to Power: Barbara Lee Speaks for Me
Jeannette Rankin, the only member of Congress to vote against American entry into World War II
Shirley Chisholm, the first African American woman to be elected to Congress and run for the Democratic presidential nomination
 List of African-American United States representatives
 Women in the United States House of Representatives

References

Further reading
  September 15, 2001
 Alone on the Hill Mother Jones, September 20, 2001, interview with Barbara Lee
 Permanent Occupation Rep. Barbara Lee, In These Times, September 29, 2005
 A Progressive State of the Union Barbara Lee and Lynn Woolsey, In These Times, January 31, 2006
 Rep. Barbara Lee: Lone Lawmaker to Vote Against 2001 Authorization - video report by Democracy Now!, October 7, 2009

External links

 Congresswoman Barbara Lee official U.S. House website
 
 

 Inventory of the Barbara Lee Papers, African American Museum & Library at Oakland, Oakland Public Library.

|-

|-

|-

|-

|-

|-

|-

1946 births
21st-century American politicians
21st-century American women politicians
Activists from California
Activists from Texas
African-American Christians
African-American members of the United States House of Representatives
African-American state legislators in California
African-American women in politics
American anti–Iraq War activists
American anti–death penalty activists
American people of Bissau-Guinean descent
American people of Sierra Leonean descent
Baptists from Texas
Baptists from California
Baptists from the United States
Democratic Party California state senators
American cannabis activists
Female members of the United States House of Representatives
Living people
Democratic Party members of the California State Assembly
Democratic Party members of the United States House of Representatives from California
Mills College alumni
Protestants from California
People from El Paso, Texas
Politicians from Los Angeles
Politicians from Oakland, California
San Fernando High School alumni
UC Berkeley School of Social Welfare alumni
Women state legislators in California
Former Roman Catholics
Candidates in the 2024 United States Senate elections